Hermann Hreiðarsson (born 11 July 1974) is an Icelandic former professional football player and coach. He played as a defender and spent 15 seasons in England, gaining a total of 315 appearances in the Premier League.

Hermann was relegated from the Premier League five times, a record he holds jointly with Nathan Blake. He was relegated with every Premier League club he has played for: Crystal Palace (1997–98 season), Wimbledon (1999–2000), Ipswich Town (2001–02), Charlton Athletic (2006–07), and Portsmouth (2009–10).

Club career

Early career
In 1993, Hermann started playing for his local club ÍBV, where he took part in five seasons with the team. He only played three matches out of 18 in his first season as the club finished 8th out of 10, but played all the matches in the next two seasons with the club finishing 8th and then 3rd. He then played every match but one in his fourth season as the club finished 4th. He left before the completion of his last season, but the club ended up as champions of Iceland for the second time and for the first time in 18 years, with Hermann playing a big role in the turnaround of the club's fortunes.

In 1997, Hermann was scouted by Premier League newcomers Crystal Palace. He came into English football in August that year when Palace signed him up. He was one of the team's few stand-out players in a season where Palace were relegated. At Palace, Hermann scored league goals against Sheffield Wednesday and Chelsea, with the latter goal briefly giving Palace the lead at Stamford Bridge. He also scored once in the League Cup against Torquay United.

Brentford
In September 1998, Hermann opted to move further down The Football League and followed recently departed Crystal Palace chairman Ron Noades to Brentford, where Noades was now chairman as well as the manager. He joined the London-based Third Division side for a then-club record incoming fee of £750,000.

Brentford were champions of the Third Division and Hermann scored six goals, but in October 1999, he signed for Premier League side Wimbledon in a deal worth £2.5 million, which remained Brentford's record transfer fee received until September 2014. They were later relegated from the top flight that season. During his time at Wimbledon, he scored once against West Ham United.

Ipswich Town
A£4.5 million move before the 2000–01 season saw him become newly promoted Ipswich Town's record signing. Ipswich finished fifth in the club's first season back in the Premier League, thus securing a UEFA Cup place. The following season, there was a complete reversal of fortunes, and they were relegated. Ipswich trimmed their squad to save on finances, but Hermann turned down a move to newly promoted West Bromwich Albion at the start of the 2002–03 season – reportedly due to West Bromwich offering him vastly reduced wages compared to what he was currently receiving, and also Hermann not wanting to face another relegation battle. At Ipswich he scored league goals against Manchester City and West Ham United and scored once in the UEFA Cup against Helsingborg.

Charlton Athletic
In March 2003, Hermann moved on from Ipswich, joining Premier League side Charlton Athletic. He signed a three-and-a-half-year contract, with the club paying £800,000, plus a further £100,000 if they were not relegated in the 2003–04 season to Hermann. He was able to move to Charlton outside the Premier League's transfer window as Ipswich were in administration, although he would not be eligible to play for the club for the remainder of that season.

Hermann proved his worth for Charlton after making his debut in a 3–0 home defeat at the hands of Manchester City. He would miss only five matches in his debut season, and would be regular starter in subsequent years.

Portsmouth
On 25 May 2007, Hermann exercised a clause in his contract with Charlton which allowed him to leave on a free transfer if they were relegated and signed a two-year deal with fellow Premier League club Portsmouth. On 29 September, Hermann scored his first goal for Portsmouth in a 7–4 Premier League win at home against Reading. He followed that up with another goal the following weekend against Fulham. On 20 April 2008, Hermann was sent off for a professional foul on Darius Vassell at the City of Manchester Stadium against Manchester City, but his season ended well by lifting the FA Cup after a 1–0 victory over Cardiff City at Wembley Stadium.

Hermann scored two goals in two matches for the second season running in 2009, when he netted with headers against both Liverpool and Manchester City. In December 2009, he scored the first goal in a 2–0 victory against Burnley. On 27 March 2010, Hermann snapped his achilles tendon in an away match against Tottenham Hotspur and was ruled out for the rest of the season. After the match, Spurs and former Portsmouth manager Harry Redknapp commented, "The game was soured by Hermann's injury. The lads said they heard it pop."  Due to this injury, Hermann was unable to play in the 2010 FA Cup Final.

After Portsmouth were relegated from the Premier League, it became unknown whether Hermann would stay at the club. However, on 8 October, he signed a new one-year contract. For most of the 2010–11 season, Hermann remained on the bench, as manager Steve Cotterill preferred loan signing Carl Dickinson, but in the latter part of the season, he became first-choice ahead of Dickinson and made his 500th league appearance against Barnsley on 19 February 2011. He signed a new one-year contract with Portsmouth on 8 July.

Coventry City
On 14 January 2012, after a long injury spell and limited playing time, it was announced that Hermann would sign for fellow Championship side Coventry City on a six-month contract. He was injured after only two appearances and could not play for the rest of the season.

Hermann was released by Coventry when his contract ran out at the end of the 2011–12 season. Coincidentally, both Coventry City and Portsmouth were relegated from the Championship that season.

Portsmouth trial
On 4 September 2012, a rumour circulated that Hermann was to offer his services to Portsmouth and play for nothing. The following day, the rumour was confirmed by local newspaper The News. In an online article, manager Michael Appleton stated "Hermann will come in and train with us towards the end of the week and we will see where he is from a fitness point of view. He tells me he wants to play for nothing but we will assess him. I am certainly not ruling it out. We will see how his fitness is, like we would do with any triallist". Hermann intended to play in an upcoming League One match against Crawley Town, but due to his appointment as manager of his hometown club ÍBV, he did not play.

International career
Hermann made his debut for Iceland in a June 1996 friendly match against Cyprus, coming on as a substitute for Alexander Högnason. He since become a strongly established member of the team, collecting 89 caps and captaining the side in his later years.

Managerial career
Hermann reached an agreement with his hometown club ÍBV on 19 September 2012 to become their manager for the 2013 Úrvalsdeild season. He would later sign former English international goalkeeper and Portsmouth teammate David James for the 2013 season. He then spent three years at Fylkir, managing the men's team during the 2015 and 2016 seasons, and the women's team during the 2017 season. In January 2018, he teamed up once again with David James at Kerala Blasters in the Indian Super League as assistant manager, after James' appointment as manager.

On 22 October 2019, he was appointed assistant to Sol Campbell at Southend United of English League One. Following the club's relegation, on 30 June 2020, manager Campbell and his three assistants left the club by mutual consent.

Personal life
Hermann has four children, two boys with his current fiancé Alexandra Fanney Jóhannsdóttir, and two girls, footballers Ída Marín and Thelma Lóa, from his previous marriage to Ragna Lóa Stefánsdóttir.

Career statistics

Club

International

Scores and results list Iceland's goal tally first, score column indicates score after each Hermann goal.

Honours
ÍBV
Úrvalsdeild: 1997

Brentford
Football League Third Division:  1998–99

Portsmouth
FA Cup: 2007–08

Individual
Icelandic Footballer of the Year: 1997, 2000, 2007
PFA Team of the Year: 1998–99 Third Division
Ipswich Town Hall of Fame: Inducted 2019

References

External links

 
 
 

1974 births
Living people
Hermann Hreidarsson
Hermann Hreidarsson
Hermann Hreidarsson
Hermann Hreidarsson
Hermann Hreidarsson
Crystal Palace F.C. players
Brentford F.C. players
Wimbledon F.C. players
Ipswich Town F.C. players
Charlton Athletic F.C. players
Portsmouth F.C. players
Coventry City F.C. players
Premier League players
English Football League players
Expatriate footballers in England
Hermann Hreidarsson
Hermann Hreidarsson
Hermann Hreidarsson
Hermann Hreidarsson
Úrvalsdeild karla (football) managers
Association football defenders
Southend United F.C. non-playing staff
Kerala Blasters FC non-playing staff
FA Cup Final players